Eva Quinn Dolan (born January 15, 2004) is an American musician and actress, best known for originating the role of Katie in the Broadway adaption of School of Rock.

Life and career
The daughter of Patrick Dolan and Abbey Gardner, Dolan moved with her family to New York City at the age four and started acting at the age five.  Dolan started acting at Kid City Theater.

At age 11, Dolan originated the role of Katie the fifth grade bass player, and is known for the "bass face" in School of Rock at the Winter Garden Theatre in New York. Dolan also originated the role of Katie in the June 2015 Off-Broadway workshop of School of Rock  at the Gramercy Theatre in New York.

In the spring of 2017 Dolan was featured in the Drew Gasparini and Alex Brightman new musical adaptation of Ned Vizzini's It's Kind of a Funny Story at Feinstein's/54 Below off-broadway.  Dolan joined Colton Ryan of Dear Evan Hansen as Leila his little sister to debut the song "Did You Know?".  Dolan also acted in the Gasperini/Brightman musical The Whipping Boy.

Dolan revived the role originated by Pia Zadora in the one-night revival of Henry, Sweet Henry at Feinstein's/54 Below in June 2017.

September 2017 Dolan performed "Aquarius/Let the Sunshine In" from the musical Hair at the American Theatre Wing's Centennial Gala. The gala raised a record-breaking $1.2 million for the organization.

Dolan performed with fellow School of Rock alumni Brandon Niederauer, Ethan Khusidman, Raghav Mehrotra, along with Swedish recording artist Peter Jöback and the original Christine Daaé Sarah Brightman at a special gala performance of the title song from The Phantom of the Opera as it marked its 30th anniversary at the Majestic Theatre on January 24, 2018.

September 2018 Dolan participated in the record breaking American Theatre Wing gala honoring EGOT Andrew Lloyd Webber raising over $1.6 million for Sir Lloyd Webber's Initiative Legacy Fund. Dolan performed the bass as part of a "mega-band" consisting of fellow School of Rock alumni Brandon Niederauer, Ethan Khusidman, and Raghav Mehrotra.  Dolan and the band played two songs at the gala; the title song from The Phantom of the Opera with fellow School of Rock alumni and Broadway.com Audience Awards winner Sierra Boggess and Tony Award nominated singer actor Norm Lewis and Heaven on Their Minds with the star of the Emmy Award winning Jesus Christ Superstar Live in Concert star Brandon Victor Dixon.

Discography
 School of Rock cast recording

Awards and nominations

References

External links
 
 
 Meet the Insanely Talented Kid Band From Broadway's 'School of Rock'
 Q&A with School of Rock The Musical’s Evie Dolan

American child singers
American child musicians
American child actresses
2004 births
Musicians from Miami
Living people
21st-century American singers
21st-century American women